Juliette M. Passer is an American attorney, writer, music director for E.S. Records, and founder of the Panamanagement Corporation.

She was an American Adviser to the Committee of Economic Development of St. Petersburg, Russian Federation, for the development of free economic zones from 1990-1993, and participated as an American expert in drafting and commenting on various legislation for several Republics in the former USSR. From 1997 to 1999, she served as an American adviser to the Finance Committee of St. Petersburg, Russian Federation.

Ms. Passer is a member of the Council on Foreign Relations. The Council on Foreign Relations (CFR) is an American nonprofit, nonpartisan membership organization, and served on the board of directors of the Council for Trade and Economic Cooperation, and other companies. She maintains a wide range of contacts in Russian regions as well as in Eastern Europe, Central Asia, Panama and China.

Ms. Passer has written and spoken widely about issues of commerce and law in new markets, the internet, information technology and e-commerce. She is a frequent guest lecturer and adjunct faculty member at the Russian Juridical Academy of the Tashkent State University of Economics, Kaplan University, Marywood University, Moravian College and others.

Studies 
Juliette Passer holds a JD (cum laude) from Benjamin N. Cardozo School of Law, and also studied Soviet Law at the Columbia University School of Law. Ms Passer holds a Bachelor of Music degree, and a Master of Music degree, from the Manhattan School of Music, where she majored in harp, conducting, and music education. Her postgraduate work at New York University was in child psychology and music therapy. She also studied at the Juilliard School in New York, and the Santa Cecilia Conservatory in Rome, Italy.

Career 
Ms. Passer practiced law with the international law firms of Patterson Belknap Webb & Tyler and Debevoise & Plimpton in New York, specializing in corporate and project finance. She has represented both United States and international clients in such sectors as aircraft leasing, aviation, pharmaceuticals, petrochemicals, transportation, telecommunications, technology transfer, information technology (IT) and the internet, executive compensation and wealth preservation, advertising, clothing manufacturing, defense conversion, energy production and conversion, entertainment, non-profit organizations and printing. She has worked on international transactions ranging from mid-size joint ventures, a 300 million dollar debt restructuring of a United States telecommunications company, and a 250 million dollar petrochemical plant financing by a Finnish company, among numerous others, in such diverse markets as the former republics of the USSR, Eastern and Western Europe, China, Turkey and Panama where Ms Passer has maintained an office since 2007.

In recent years, Ms. Passer has worked with internet-based companies on projects in financing, licensing and domain names, disputes, international business transactions and general corporate representation for new media and IT companies. She also serves on the board of directors of several major companies.

References 
 Who's Who of American Law-Marquis
 Who's Who of American Women-Marquis
 Cardozo Life Magazine
 Uniquely me
 Scientific Commons
 Namebase.org (Archive)
 The Impact of perestroika on Soviet law By Albert J. Schmidt, Preface
 Russia's Constitutional Rev. By Robert Ahdieh, p179

External links 
 PanaManagement Corporation Site

Living people
American women lawyers
People from New York (state)
Manhattan School of Music alumni
Benjamin N. Cardozo School of Law alumni
Year of birth missing (living people)
Patterson Belknap Webb & Tyler people
21st-century American women